Shanyang County is a county in southeastern Shaanxi province, China, bordering Hubei province to the south.

Administrative divisions
Shanyang County has 2 subdistricts and 8 towns.
2 subdistricts
 Chengguan
 Shilipu

8 towns
 Banyan
 Sehepu
 Xiaohekou
 Yangdi
 Nankuanping
 Manchuanguan
 Xizhaochuan
 Yinhua

Climate

References

County-level divisions of Shaanxi
Shangluo